Ta Kung Pao (formerly L'Impartial) is the oldest active Chinese language newspaper in China. Founded in Tianjin in 1902, the paper is state-owned, controlled by the Liaison Office of the Central Government after the Chinese Civil War. It is widely regarded as a veteran pro-Beijing newspaper. In 2016, it merged with Hong Kong newspaper Wen Wei Po.

History

In the final years of the Qing dynasty, Ying Lianzhi, a Catholic Manchu aristocrat, founded the newspaper in Tianjin on 17 June 1902, in order to, "help China become a modern and democratic nation". The paper put forward the slogan Four-No-ism" (四不主義) in its early years, pledging to say "No" to all political parties, governments, commercial companies, and persons.
It stood up to the repression at the time, openly criticising the Empress Dowager Cixi and reactionary leaders, and promoted democratic reforms, pioneering the use of written vernacular Chinese (baihua). Readership fell after the Xinhai Revolution in 1911 and Wang Zhilong (王郅隆) bought it in 1916. Still, the newspaper was out of business by 1925 due to the lack of readership. On 1 September 1926, however, Wu Dingchang (吳鼎昌), Hu Zhengzhi, and Zhang Jiluan (張季鸞) re-established the newspaper in Tianjin. With "no party affiliation, no political endorsement, no self-promotion, no ignorance" (不黨, 不賣, 不私, 不盲) as its motto, the newspaper's popularity quickly rose again because of its sharp political commentary, especially of the Japanese as the Second Sino-Japanese War began.

As the war raged on, the newspaper's staff fled to other cities, such as Shanghai, Hankou, Chongqing, Guilin and Hong Kong, to continue publishing, but local editions were abandoned as the Japanese captured more and more territory. After the war was won, Wong Wan San (王芸生), the chief editor, re-established the Shanghai edition on 1 November 1945, in the format and style of the old Shanghai edition. They had also planned to issue editions for other cities, including Guangzhou, but the Chinese Civil War forced this proposal to be shelved. Ta Kung Pao supported the Kuomintang at the beginning of the Civil War, but switched its sympathies to the Chinese Communist Party (CCP) after the repression of intellectuals, hyper-inflation, and other violent purges of political opponents by the Kuomintang.

In March 1948, the Hong Kong edition was re-established. A major newspaper during the Republican years, it continued to be influential after re-publication by Fei Yi Ming, the subsequent publisher in Hong Kong after 1949, as one of few newspapers that survived foreign invasion and civil war. In April 1952, the colonial authorities in Hong Kong tried the newspaper's proprietor, publisher, and its editor for violation of the Sedition Ordinance. Ta Kung Pao, along with the New Evening Post and Wen Wei Po, were charged with inciting an uprising by negatively reporting on the colonial authorities' response to a fire in Tung Tau Tsuen. As a result, Ta Kung Pao'''s leadership was fined, jailed, and ordered to cease reporting for six months.

A mass demonstration began in 1953 after protesters became dissatisfied with the Hong Kong government following a fire in the Tung Tau squatter area. The government in Guangzhou began fundraising to support the protesters and decided to dispatch a relief delegation to Hong Kong on 1 March 1952. The trip was cancelled after opposition from the Hong Kong government, and protests began on the same day targeting the Hong Kong police. Wen Wei Po and other publications supporting the Chinese government produced frequent reports emphasising the Hong Kong government's neglect of the poor.   On March 5, New Evening Post, Wen Wei Po and Ta Kung Pao reprinted an editorial from People's Daily, the newspaper of the CCP Central Committee but removed references to "massacre of our countrymen" to avoid violating Hong Kong's Sedition Ordinance. However, the Hong Kong government accused the newspapers of sedition. Ta Kung Pao, its owner Fei Yiming and publisher Li Zongying received to nine and six months of prison sentence and fined a few thousand Hong Kong dollars. The newspaper was also ordered to stop publishing for six months.

Chinese Premier Zhou Enlai then issued a statement demanding Hong Kong to stop the prosecution. The British government told Hong Kong authorities days later to rescind the revoke the court sentence against Ta Kung Pao, its owner and its publisher, and the newspaper was allowed to publish again after 12 days of suspension. 

In January 2019, Ta Kung Pao published an article stating that a "secret envoy" of president Tsai Ing-wen had met with three Hong Kong activists from the pro-independence group Student Localism. However, the "secret envoy" was actually Su Yong-yao, a senior political reporter for Liberty Times, a Taiwanese newspaper. The article was in turn criticized by the Taiwanese presidential office as "ridiculous" and  "a piece of fake news".

In 2020, Ta Kung Pao frequently attacked judges perceived as siding with pro-democracy protesters, causing Chief Justice Geoffrey Ma to make an 18-page plea against attacking judges and the judiciary system. In November 2020, the Hong Kong Bar Association (HKBA) published a letter to Secretary of Justice Teresa Cheng, accusing Ta Kung Pao of publishing false material that claimed judge Anderson Chow was being supportive of criminal activities. The HKBA asked Teresa Cheng to protect the city's judges against false accusations.

Organization

The paper is state-owned, controlled by the Liaison Office of the Central Government in Hong Kong. The head office of Ta Kung Pao is located on Hennessy Road, Wan Chai, Hong Kong Island, with offices in mainland China, such as in Beijing, Shanghai, Tianjin, Inner-Mongolia and Guangzhou.

See also

 Newspapers of Hong Kong
 Wen Wei Po The New Evening Post''
 Yang Gang, a prominent female journalist for the paper

References

External links
 

Chinese-language newspapers published in Hong Kong
Publications established in 1902
Chinese propaganda organisations
Propaganda newspapers and magazines
1902 establishments in China